"Love Is a House" is a 1987 song by American R&B group Force M.D.'s. Released on the band's Touch and Go album, the single was the group's third top ten hit on the Billboards Black Singles chart, and their most successful on that chart peaking at number one for two weeks, in the summer of 1987. "Love Is a House" was also the group's second and final Hot 100 release, peaking at number seventy-eight.

Charts
Weekly charts

References

1987 singles
Force MDs songs
Tommy Boy Records singles
1987 songs